Your Ice Cream's Dirty is the debut studio album by the American rock band Devilhead.

Track listing

Personnel
Brian Wood - vocals, guitar, bass, piano
Kevin Wood - guitar
John McBain - guitar
Dan McDonald - bass
Shawn Smith - piano
John Waterman - bass, vocals

External links
Your Ice Cream's Dirty at Allmusic

Devilhead albums
1994 albums